Ludwig Staiger is a German mathematician and computer scientist at the Martin Luther University of Halle-Wittenberg.

Previously he held positions at the Academy of Sciences in Berlin (East), the Central Institute of Cybernetics and Information Processes, the Karl Weierstrass Institute for Mathematics and the Technical University Otto-von-Guericke Magdeburg. He was a visiting professor at RWTH Aachen University, the universities Dortmund, Siegen, and Cottbus in Germany and the Technical University Vienna, Austria. He is a member of the Managing Committee of the Georg Cantor Association and an external researcher of the Center for Discrete Mathematics and Theoretical Computer Science at the University of Auckland, New Zealand.

He co-invented with Klaus Wagner the Staiger–Wagner automaton. Staiger is an expert in ω-languages, an area in which he wrote more than 19 papers  including the paper on this topic in the monograph. He found surprising applications of ω-languages in the study of Liouville numbers.

Staiger is an active researcher in combinatorics on words, automata theory,  effective dimension theory, and algorithmic information theory.

Notes

Bibliography
 L. Staiger. Quasiperiods of infinite words. In Alexandra Bellow, Cristian S. Calude, editors, Mathematics Almost Everywhere: In Memory of Solomon Marcus, pages 17–36, World Scientific, Singapore, 2018. 
 C. S. Calude, L. Staiger. Liouville numbers, Borel normality and algorithmic randomness, Theory of Computing Systems,  First online 27 April 2017, doi:10.1007/s00224-017-9767-8. 
 Staiger, L. "Exact Constructive and Computable Dimensions", Theory of Computing Systems 61 (2017) 4, 1288-1314.
 C. S. Calude, L. Staiger, F. Stephan. Finite state incompressible infinite sequences, Information and Computation 247 (2016), 23-36. 
 Staiger, L. "On Oscillation-Free Chaitin h-Random Sequences". In  [M. Dinneen, B. Khoussainov and A. Nies, editors, Computation, Physics and Beyond, pages 194-202. Springer-Verlag, 2012.
 Staiger, L. The Kolmogorov complexity of infinite words, Electronic Colloquium on Computational Complexity (EECC) 13, 70 (2006).
 Staiger, L. "ω-Languages". In G. Rozenberg and A. Salomaa, editors, Handbook of Formal Languages, Volume 3, pages 339-387. Springer-Verlag, Berlin, 1997.

External links
 Ludwig Staiger Home Page
 CDMTCS at the University of Auckland
 
 
 Algorithmic Complexity and Applications: Special issue of   Fundamenta Informaticae  (83, 1-2, 2008), dedicated to Professor L. Staiger 60's birthday.

Theory of computation
Formal languages
21st-century German mathematicians
Year of birth missing (living people)
Living people
German computer scientists
20th-century German mathematicians
University of Jena alumni
Academic staff of the Martin Luther University of Halle-Wittenberg